Whish is a surname, and may refer to:

 C. M. Whish (1794–1833), English civil servant of the East India Company and author of the first western paper on the Kerala school of astronomy and mathematics
 J. L. Whish, his brother and also an English civil servant of the East India Company
 David Whish-Wilson (born 1966), Australian author 
 Claudius Buchanan Whish (1827-1890), Australian sugar-planter
 Peter Whish-Wilson (born 1968), Australian politician

See also 
 Wish (disambiguation)